Hooty Phillips was a professional baseball second baseman in the Negro leagues. He played with the Nashville Elite Giants in 1922, and with the Detroit Stars and Milwaukee Bears in 1923.

References

External links
 and Seamheads

Detroit Stars players
Milwaukee Bears players
Year of birth missing
Year of death missing
Baseball second basemen